In mathematics, more specifically in abstract algebra, the concept of integrally closed has three meanings:

 An integral domain  is said to be integrally closed if it is equal to its integral closure in its field of fractions.
An ordered group G is called integrally closed if for all elements a and b of G, if an ≤ b for all natural numbers n then a ≤ 1.